The Eagle River Stadium is an ice rink and arena located in Eagle River, Wisconsin.

History
The Eagle River Stadium, which seats roughly 2,000 people, was designed by German immigrant architect and engineer Max Hanisch, Sr. and constructed by local volunteers and community residents. Constructed mainly of wood in 1925, it is the first indoor hockey arena built in the state of Wisconsin. The roof framing is a wooden lamella design, using solid-sawn timbers interconnected in a unique honeycomb pattern. The facility is affectionately referred to as "The Dome" because of its dome-like shape. It has received major renovations once, in 1963–1964, when new locker rooms, indoor plumbing, and a concession stand were added.

The arena is home to the local high school hockey team, the Northland Pines Eagles; the ERRA Youth Hockey Association; a semi-pro hockey team, the Eagle River Falcons; a tier II junior ice hockey team, the Wisconsin Windigo; and the Wisconsin Hockey Hall of Fame.

References

External links
Wisconsin Hockey Hall of Fame

Sports venues in Wisconsin
Sports venues on the National Register of Historic Places in Wisconsin
Buildings and structures in Vilas County, Wisconsin
Indoor ice hockey venues in Wisconsin
National Register of Historic Places in Vilas County, Wisconsin